Railway Wood is a woodland in County Durham, England, near the village of Fence Houses. It is owned and managed by the Woodland Trust.

References

Forests and woodlands of County Durham